
Hallmark of Harmony is the male barbershop chorus of the Sheffield Barbershop Harmony Club, based in Sheffield, England. The chorus formed in 1978 and has won the British Association of Barbershop Singers (BABS) gold medal eight times, in 1986, 1989, 1991, 1994, 1997, 2000, 2014 and 2019. It won the silver medal in 1983, 1984, 1988, 1993, 1996, 1999 and 2013 & bronze in 1985 and 2012.

In 2019 Hallmark achieved the UK's second highest score ever of 83.2%, 2.4% clear of their nearest rivals and coming top in every judging category.

As BABS Chorus Champions for 2014, Hallmark of Harmony qualified to represent the country in the Barbershop Harmony Society International Chorus Contest in Pittsburgh, PA in July 2015. They did so, taking a chorus of some 60+ members, and achieved an A-level score and a place of 19th in the world. This was their fourth trip to the contest.

The group's name comes from Sheffield's long tradition of silversmithing, where a hallmark was used to identify the silversmith, the grade of metal and the date of creation of items.

A sister chorus is the ladies' Sheffield Harmony chorus.

Project Horizon
In 2011, the chorus launched what they called 'Project Horizon'. This was an initiative to recover from a continuous decline in rankings at the BABS chorus contests: since winning the gold medal in 2000, the chorus began to lose places, eventually coming 10th in 2011 (with their lowest ever average percentage score).

Project Horizon was in essence a re-structure of the competition strategy. Under the new model, the chorus maintained weekly Tuesday rehearsals for repertoire work only, and allocated a number of weekends in the months before the competition to prepare. As well as giving a focus to contest preparation, this also allowed other singers who could not commit to weekly rehearsals to join the chorus for the contest. Notably, a number of members from the University of Manchester Barbershop Chorus sang with Hallmark of Harmony in the contest, which took place in Southport in May 2012. In that competition, Hallmark of Harmony received an unprecedented rise in rankings, winning the bronze medal for 3rd place (a rise of 7 places).

In 2013, a similar strategy was adopted, except this time a large number of 'extra singers' joined the chorus for the competition alongside the Manchester University chorus. 70 singers performed on the contest stage in Bournemouth in May 2013, and the chorus received the silver medal for 2nd place along with their highest ever score (78.9% average across 9 judges).

2014 saw Project Horizon 3 take place in preparation for the BABS 40th Anniversary Convention in Harrogate, UK. The 80-strong chorus performed "My Romance" and an original arrangement by Dr. Liz Garnett of "I Won't Dance". They also received coaching from Jordan Travis, assistant director of the Toronto Northern Lights. They achieved a score of 81.3%, making them the only 'A' scoring chorus in a BABS contest for 12 years. They became BABS Chorus Champions, and qualified for the 2015 Barbershop Harmony Society International Chorus Contest in Pittsburgh, Pennsylvania.

Project Horizon 4 was run in preparation for the contest, maintaining most of the Gold medal-winning chorus and only recruiting a small number of further members. They travelled to Pittsburgh, PA with around 60 members and scored 81.1%, placing 19th in the contest.

After the contest, their Musical Director, Andy Allen, resigned. Tim Briggs, who had previously held the roles of Assistant Musical Director, Choreographer, and Lead Section Leader, took on the post of Musical Director. In 2016, under Tim's leadership, the chorus competed in the BABS Annual Convention in Harrogate and achieved a Bronze Medal placing. Project Horizon 5 is now under way. preparing for the 2017 Convention and Competition.

Recently, the chorus has entered into a partnership with the Sheffield Music Hub, an organisation which enables young people from all backgrounds to access an eclectic range of musical experiences. As a result, in February 2017 a joint performance by the Sheffield Senior Schools Orchestra and Hallmark of Harmony was staged in Sheffield Cathedral. During this show, for the first time ever, the chorus sang two songs accompanied by a symphony orchestra. The partnership continues, with members of the Chorus helping with the development of the Hub's Festival Choir, which will culminate in another joint performance in July, at Sheffield's Millennium Gallery.

In July, 2016, Hallmark performed for the first time at Sheffield's celebrated Tramlines Festival. The performance was so successful that the chorus will be doing it again in 2017. Similarly, they will be competing for the second time at the Llangollen Eisteddfod, also in July, 2017!

Discography
 The Best Of Barbershop (EMI / Parlaphone Label) 1992. Recorded at Abbey Road Studios.
 The Barbershop Millennium Collection (Trilogy Records) 1999 - Compilation Album - Recorded on location 'Westfield School in Sheffield' by Gordon Lorenz - Engineer: Steve Plews - Mastered at: B.A.S. Studios - Production by: Gordon Lorenz.
 Barbershop Harmony (Sanctuary Records Group Ltd) - Castle Pulse Label 2002 - Sound recording copyright owned by Gordon Lorenz - This album is a rerelease of the 'Millennium Collection'.

References

External links
 Hallmark of Harmony website

British Association of Barbershop Singers
A cappella musical groups
Culture in Sheffield